Ladoga Skerries National Park is located on the north and northwestern shores of Lake Ladoga in the Republic of Karelia, Russia. The park features numerous small rocky islands (skerries) on narrow bays and channels. The park was officially created in 2017.

History 
Lake Ladoga is the largest lake in Europe, with total area encompassing ; it has various fishes. In the post-World War I era, the lake became popular among tourists. The earliest proposal for creation of a national park was proposed by Karelian Research Centre of RAS in late 1980s. However, the project was stalled due to reasons such as close proximity in Sortavala and presence of various country houses. There was another unsuccessful attempt in 1999, when the European Union sponsored the project, spending 3.5 million euros. However, the authors of that project observed that: "the attitude of the local community toward the park is one of the thorniest questions." The park was finally established on December 28, 2017, by an order of the Government of Russia.

Topography
The park covers an archipelago of approximately 500 islands on the northwestern coasts of Lake Ladoga. The term "skerries" is derived from an old Norse for "a reef or rocky island".

Ecoregion and climate 
The park is in the southern latitudes of the Scandinavian and Russian taiga ecoregion, a region of conifers, and near the northern reaches of the Sarmatic mixed forests.

Plants and animals 
The islands are covered with coniferous forests, about 90% pine and 10% spruce. The non-forested land features meadows and swamps. Plant biodiversity is relatively high. There are 748 species of vascular plants that have been recorded in the park, of which 101 are on the protected list for the region. There is a high presence of bryophytes (a collective term for liverworts, hornworts, and mosses). Almost 350 species of bryophytes and over 700 species of lichens have been found in the park. Water covers 44% of the park with 3 known species that include freshwater whitefish, bream, and northern pike.

See also 
 Protected areas of Russia

References

Works cited

External links

 Map of Ladozhskie shhery, Digital Observatory for Protected Areas
 Map of Ladoga Skerries National Park, OpenStreetMap
 Video walking tour of Ladoga Skerries (Youtube)

National parks of Russia